NWA Pop-Up Event is a series of professional wrestling supercard events scripted and promoted by the National Wrestling Alliance (NWA) in conjunction with various independent professional wrestling promotions. NWA President William Patrick Corgan explained the concept as "being able to work, show up anywhere in the world that appreciates moments", and partnering with local promotions.

The inaugural event, New Years Clash, was held on January 5, 2019, and co-produced with Crimson's Tried-N-True Wrestling in Clarksville, Tennessee.

Dates, venues, and main events

References

External links

Recurring events established in 2019
National Wrestling Alliance shows